The North Cachar Hills Autonomous Council  (NCHAC), also known as Dima Hasao Autonomous Council, is an autonomous district council in the state of Assam in India. It was constituted under the provisions of the Sixth Schedule of the Constitution of India to administrate the Dima Hasao district and to develop the hill people in the area. Its headquarters is in Haflong, Dima Hasao district.

Members
The council has 30 members of which 28 are elected by the first past the post system and 2 are nominated by the state government of Assam. It is led by a Chief Executive Member, currently Debolal Gorlosa.

Constituencies
Constituencies under Dima Hasao Autonomous Council:
 Haflong
 Jatinga
 Borail
 Mahur
 Jinam
 Hangrum
 Laisong
 Dautohaja
 Maibang East
 Maibang West
 Kalachand
 Wajao
 Hajadisa
 Langting
 Hatikhali
 Diyungmukh
 Garampani
 Kharthong
 Dehangi
 Gunjung
 Hadingma
 Dihamlai
 Harangajao
 Hamri
 Lower Kharthong
 Dolong
 Diger
 Semkhor

See also
 Moran Autonomous Council
 Hill tribes of Northeast India
 North Eastern Council

References

External links
North Cachar Hills Autonomous Council
Dima Hasao District
Department of Information and Public Relations

Autonomous district councils of India
Local government in Assam
Year of establishment missing